Oliver William Hynd MBE, known as Ollie, (born 27 October 1994 in Mansfield, Nottinghamshire) is a British swimmer. He competed in the Paralympics as a class 8 swimmer, having neuromuscular myopathy and associated limb deformities. In 2018, following reclassification protocols, Hynd moved into the S9 class, but remained in SB8 for breaststroke.

Hynd made his international debut at the 2011 IPC European Championships where he won the 200 m individual medley, beating his older brother Sam's previous European record. In the 400 m freestyle, he finished in second place just behind brother Sam.

Hynd won a gold medal in the SM8 200m individual medley at the 2012 London Paralympics. He also claimed a silver in the S8 men's 400m freestyle and a bronze in the S8 men's 100m backstroke.

He was appointed Member of the Order of the British Empire (MBE) in the 2013 New Year Honours for services to swimming.

In 2015, Hynd was awarded the Disabled Sportsperson of the Year accolade at the Nottinghamshire Sports Awards for the second year in a row.

At the Rio de Janeiro Paralympic Games in 2016, Hynd won the gold medal in his opening event, the 400m freestyle S8, beating the world record in the final, held on 8 September. He repeated the feat in his closing event, winning gold and setting a new world record in the 200 m individual medley SM8.

Recognition
Originally suggested by Charlotte Henshaw's father, Mansfield District ward councillor Paul Henshaw, to acknowledge the achievements of Ollie Hynd, the council voted in December 2014 to name the 25-metre laned pool at the town's Water Meadows complex as Hynds and Henshaw Competition Pool, to honour Ollie, his brother Sam and Charlotte Henshaw who all trained there.

In 2016, Hynd, Charlotte Henshaw and their swimming coach were all awarded the Freedom of Mansfield.

See also
 2012 Olympics gold post boxes in the United Kingdom

References

1994 births
Sportspeople from Mansfield
Living people
British male freestyle swimmers
Members of the Order of the British Empire
Paralympic swimmers of Great Britain
Paralympic silver medalists for Great Britain
Paralympic gold medalists for Great Britain
Paralympic bronze medalists for Great Britain
Swimmers at the 2012 Summer Paralympics
Commonwealth Games gold medallists for England
Swimmers at the 2014 Commonwealth Games
Medalists at the 2012 Summer Paralympics
S8-classified Paralympic swimmers
Commonwealth Games medallists in swimming
Swimmers at the 2016 Summer Paralympics
Medalists at the 2016 Summer Paralympics
Medalists at the World Para Swimming Championships
Medalists at the World Para Swimming European Championships
Paralympic medalists in swimming
British male backstroke swimmers
British male medley swimmers
Medallists at the 2014 Commonwealth Games